Manuchehr Kola (also Romanized as Manūchehr Kolā) is a village in Kalej Rural District, in the Central District of Nowshahr County, Mazandaran Province, Iran. At the 2006 census, its population was 640, in 173 families.

References 

Populated places in Nowshahr County